Rivularia is a genus of freshwater snails with a gill and an operculum, aquatic gastropod mollusks in the family Viviparidae. Species in this genus is distributed only along the Xiang River region of Hunan province, People's Republic of China.

Taxonomy 
This genus was originally placed under the subfamily Bellamyinae of Viviparidae. In 2017, a reference moved the genus to Viviparinae according to anatomical and genetic data.

Species 
, WoRMS only recognize one species in this genus, namely Rivularia auriculata (E. von Martens, 1875), the type species of this genus. The original combinatiion is this species was Paludina auriculata .

 taxon inquirendum

 Rivularia bicarinata
 Rivularia calcarata
 Rivularia glandina 
 Rivularia globosa 
 Rivularia ovum 
 Rivularia subelliptica 

 Synonyms

 Rivularia auricularis  accepted as Rivularia auriculata 
 Rivularia elongata  accepted as Rivularia auriculata (junior synonym)
 Rivularia liuiana  reclassified to Mekongia as Mekongia liuiana (original combination)

References 

Viviparidae